African Elephant is an outdoor 1982 life-size Cor-ten steel sculpture depicting an African elephant by Robert Fowler (with assistance from John Long and Phil Schalekamp). The statue was originally installed at the Houston Zoo's main entrance, but was relocated in 2000, and underwent restoration work at the time.

See also

 1982 in art
 Cultural depictions of elephants
 List of public art in Houston

References

1982 establishments in Texas
1982 sculptures
Animal sculptures in Texas
Elephants in art
Outdoor sculptures in Houston
Statues in Houston
Steel sculptures in Texas